Buttermilk Crispy Tenders (formerly called Chicken Selects) were chicken strips sold by the international fast food restaurant chain McDonald's in the United States and Canada. They were introduced in early 1998 for a limited time and offered again in early 2002 and late 2003 and then permanently starting in 2004. In the UK, they were launched on the "Pound Saver Menu", which offers various menu items for £0.99.

In mid-2006, McDonald's introduced the Snack Wrap, which contains a Chicken Selects Premium Breast Strip, or as of January 2007, a Grilled Chicken Breast Strip, cheddar/jack cheese, lettuce, and either ranch, honey mustard, or chipotle barbecue sauce, all wrapped inside a white flour tortilla, priced at 99¢-$1.39 depending on the market.

Chicken Selects were terminated in 2013. The product briefly returned in 2015, but was again dropped. In August 2017, Chicken Selects returned to the menu under the name "Buttermilk Crispy Tenders", However, they were discontinued again in 2020 as a result of  COVID-19 pandemic.

Composition
Ingredients for the Chicken Selects Premium Breast Strip are listed as "Chicken breast strips, water, seasoning [salt, monosodium glutamate, carrageenan gum, chicken broth, natural flavor (plant and animal source), maltodextrin, spice, autolyzed yeast extract, chicken fat, polysorbate 80], modified potato starch, and sodium phosphates. Breaded with: wheat flour, water, food starch-modified, salt, spices, leavening (baking soda, sodium aluminum phosphate, monocalcium phosphate), garlic powder, onion powder, dextrose, spice extractives, and extractives of paprika. Prepared in vegetable oil (may contain one of the following: Canola oil, corn oil, soybean oil, hydrogenated soybean oil, partially hydrogenated soybean oil, partially hydrogenated corn oil with TBHQ and citric acid added to preserve freshness), dimethylpolysiloxane added as an antifoaming agent)."

References 

McDonald's foods
Food and drink introduced in 2002
Food and drink introduced in 2017
Defunct consumer brands
Products and services discontinued in 2020